Cleres Zoological Park (Parc Zoologique De Clères) is located in Clères,  north of Rouen, France. The park is only open to visitors between February and October.

References

External links

Zoos in France
Buildings and structures in Seine-Maritime
Tourist attractions in Seine-Maritime
Organizations based in Normandy